The 1959–60 Cincinnati Bearcats men's basketball team represented University of Cincinnati. The head coach was George Smith.

Regular season
In the Crosstown Shootout, Cincinnati beat Xavier by a score of 85–68. The match was held at the Cincinnati Gardens.

NCAA basketball tournament
Midwest 
Cincinnati 99, DePaul 59
Cincinnati 82, Kansas 71
Final Four
California 77, Cincinnati 69
Third-place game
Cincinnati 95, New York 71

Awards and honors
 Oscar Robertson, USBWA College Player of the Year, NCAA scoring leader (3x)

NBA Draft

References

Cincinnati
Cincinnati Bearcats men's basketball seasons
NCAA Division I men's basketball tournament Final Four seasons
Cincinnati
Cincinnati Bearcats men's basketball team
Cincinnati Bearcats men's basketball team